Matt Van Horn is an American entrepreneur and the CEO and co-founder of June, maker of the June Intelligent Oven. Previously he co-founded Zimride, now called the ride-sharing service Lyft, was Vice President of Business at Path, and ran partnerships at Digg He also worked at Apple while attending college.

Personal life 
Van Horn lives in San Francisco, California with his wife Lauren Van Horn to whom he live-streamed his marriage proposal in 2010. He grew up in Pacific Palisades, Los Angeles.

Education 
Van Horn graduated from University of Arizona in 2006 where he studied entrepreneurship and marketing. He made Eller’s Dean’s List in 2006 for excellence in leadership.

References 

University of Arizona alumni
Year of birth missing (living people)
Living people